Cohn is a Jewish surname (related to the last name Cohen).

Notable people sharing the surname "Cohn"
 Al Cohn (1925–1988),  American jazz saxophonist, arranger and composer
Alan D. Cohn, American government official
 Alfred A. Cohn (1880–1951), American screenwriter
 Alice Cohn (1914–2000), German graphic artist
 Art Cohn (1909–1958),  American sportswriter, screenwriter and author
 Arlen Cohn (1953-), author of Friends of a Feather and Solar System SOS
 Arthur Cohn (b. 1927), Swiss film producer
 Arthur Cohn (1894–1940), mathematician known for Cohn's irreducibility criterion
Avern Cohn (1924-2022), United States District Court judge
 Bernard Cohn (1928-2003), American anthropologist
 Craig Cohn (b. 1983), birth name of American professional wrestler Craig Classic
 Daniel Cohn-Bendit (b. 1945), French-German politician
 Dan Cohn-Sherbock (b. 1945), Jewish theologian
David Cohn (b. 1995), American-Israeli player in the Israeli Basketball Premier League
 Edwin Joseph Cohn (1892–1953), American scientist
 Emil Cohn (1854–1944), German physicist
 Erich Cohn (1884–1918), German chess master
 Ernst Max Cohn (1920–2004), American philatelic researcher and expert
 Ferdinand Cohn (1828–1898), German biologist
 Gary Cohn (b. 1960), American investment banker
 Gary Cohn (b.1952), American comic book writer
 Gretta Cohn, cellist and podcast producer
 Gustav Cohn (1840–1919), German economist
 Harry Cohn (1891–1958), American co-founder of Columbia Pictures Corporation
 Harvey Cohn (1884–1965), American track and field athlete
 James Cohn (b. 1928), American composer
 Joan Cohn (née Joan Perry), the widow of Harry Cohn
 Joseph Judson Cohn (d. 1996), MGM producer, founder of J.J. Cohn Estate
 Lawrence H. Cohn (1937–2016), American cardiac surgeon and researcher
 Leonie Cohn (1917-2009), German-born BBC Radio producer
 Leopold Cohn (1862–1937), Hungary-born Christian clergyman
 Leopold Cohn (1856–1915), German author and philologist
 Linda Cohn (b. 1959), American sportscaster
 Marc Cohn (b. 1959), American singer-songwriter 
 Mathilda Cohn (1798–1877), birth name of Finnish and Swedish concert singer Mathilda Berwald
 Mindy Cohn (b. 1966), American actress, comedian and singer
 Nate Cohn, American journalist
 Nik Cohn (b. 1946), British rock journalist
 Norman Cohn (1915–2007), British historian
 Norman Cohn (1907–1972), birth name of American saber fencer Norman C. Armitage
 Oskar Cohn (1869–1934), German politician
 Priscilla Cohn (1933–2019), American philosopher and animal rights activist
 Rebecca Cohn (b. 1954), American politician
 Robert Cohn (b. 1949), Canadian business executive, founder of Octel Communications
 Ronald Cohn, co-founder of The Gorilla Foundation
 Roy Cohn (1927–1986), American lawyer
 Ruth Cohn (1912–2010), German-born psychotherapist, educator, and poet

Other
 La Danse de Gengis Cohn (The Dance of Genghis Cohn), a novel by Romain Gary
 Marc Cohn, eponymous 1991 album
 Rebecca Cohn Auditorium, concert hall and theatre within the Dalhousie Arts Centre in Halifax, Nova Scotia
 Robert Cohn, a character in Ernest Hemingway's 1926 novel The Sun Also Rises

See also 
 Coen (disambiguation)
 Cohen (surname)
 Cohen (disambiguation)
 Kahane
 Kohen, a direct male descendant of the Biblical Aaron, brother of Moses

Jewish surnames
Kohenitic surnames
Yiddish-language surnames